No. 4  Squadron, normally written as IV Squadron, of the Royal Air Force operates the BAE Hawk T2 in the training role from RAF Valley.

History

Formation and First World War
IV Squadron formed at Farnborough in 1912 as part of the Royal Flying Corps.  Operating a miscellaneous mixture of aircraft including early Royal Aircraft Factory B.E.2s and Breguet biplanes, it quickly moved to Netheravon where it remained until the outbreak of the First World War. The more useful aircraft in its inventory were sent to France under the command of Major G. H. Rayleigh on 16 August 1914, to carry out reconnaissance in support of the British Expeditionary Force. On 19 August Lieutenant G. W. Mapplebeck flew the squadron's first mission over France, a reconnaissance flight searching for German cavalry in the vicinity of Gembloux, Belgium. Other aircraft remained in England to carry out anti-Zeppelin patrols.

The contingent in France was reinforced on 20 September by the personnel who had remained behind in England, forming C Flight, equipped with Maurice Farman "Shorthorns". It concentrated on the reconnaissance role, standardising on the B.E.2 in 1916. In the Battle of the Somme, IV Squadron flew contact patrols keeping track of the position of advancing troops at low level, in addition to more regular reconnaissance and artillery spotting missions. It re-equipped with the Royal Aircraft Factory R.E.8 in June 1917, in time to take part in the Battle of Messines and the Battle of Passchendaele. During this period William Robinson Clarke, the first black pilot to serve for Britain, flew for the squadron. It remained equipped with the R.E.8 until the Armistice with Germany on 11 November 1918 ended the fighting.  The squadron returned to the United Kingdom in February 1919, disbanding in September that year.

Between the wars
IV Squadron reformed on 30 April 1920 at Farnborough, equipped with Bristol F.2 Fighters. Part of the squadron moved to Aldergrove near Belfast in November 1920 as a result of the Irish War of Independence, moving to Baldonnel Aerodrome near Dublin in May 1921, before rejoining the rest of the squadron at Farnborough in January 1922. The squadron deployed on Royal Navy aircraft carriers when they sailed to Turkey on HMS Ark Royal and Argus during the Chanak crisis in August 1922, returning to Farnborough in September 1923. When the 1926 General Strike broke out, IV Squadron's aircraft were used to patrol railway lines to deter feared sabotage.

In October 1929, the elderly Bristol Fighters were replaced with new Armstrong Whitworth Atlas aircraft, purpose-designed for the squadron's Army co-operation role, while these in turn were replaced by Hawker Audaxes in December 1931.  In February 1937 it moved from Farnborough to RAF Odiham, soon re-equipping with the Hawker Hector, a more powerful derivative of the Audax. In January 1939, it discarded its Hector biplanes in favour of the new monoplane Westland Lysander.

Second World War

Shortly after the outbreak of the Second World War in 1939, the squadron moved to France as part of the British Expeditionary Force. Following Germany's invasion of France and the Low Countries on 10 May 1940, IV Squadron was frequently forced to change bases by the approach of the advancing German armies, being withdrawn to the UK on 24 May. Losses had been heavy, with 18 aircrew killed, while 60% of the groundcrew were lost. It continued in the coastal patrol and air-sea rescue role while training for its main Army co-operation role after returning to the UK.

In 1942 the Squadron changed its mission from the Army co-operation role, where it would operate fairly low-performance aircraft from airstrips close to the front-line, to that of fighter-reconnaissance, receiving the more modern Curtiss Tomahawk and North American Mustang, soon with the latter soon replacing Tomahawk, flying low-level attack and reconnaissance flights against targets on the continent. In August 1943, it joined 2 Tactical Air Force in support of the planned invasion of Europe, changing to the pure reconnaissance mission in January, and replacing its Mustangs with Mosquito PR.XVI and Spitfire PR.XIs. It discarded its Mosquitoes in June, moved to France in August, and briefly supplemented its Spitfires with a few Hawker Typhoons for low-level reconnaissance. It retained its Spitfires at VE Day, moving to Celle in Germany to carry out survey operations in support of the British Army of Occupation until it was disbanded on 31 August 1945.

Post War operations

The squadron reformed the next day by renumbering 605 Squadron, a light bomber squadron equipped with Mosquitoes based at Volkel in the Netherlands.  It re-equipped with de Havilland Vampire fighter-bombers in July 1950, replacing them with North American Sabres in October 1953.  The Sabres were discarded in favour of the Hawker Hunter in July 1955, retaining these until the squadron disbanded at RAF Jever on 31 December 1960.

Again, the squadron did not remain dormant for long, as it reformed on 1 January 1961 by renumbering No. 79 Squadron RAF, flying Hunter FR.10s in the low-level reconnaissance role. It re-equipped with the Hawker-Siddeley Harrier in 1970, first flying them from RAF Wildenrath in West Germany. It moved on to RAF Gütersloh in 1977.

The squadron operated the Harrier until the final withdrawal of the type, receiving numerous upgrades and new versions over the years. In April 1999, the squadron left Germany to move to RAF Cottesmore.

On 31 March 2010, IV Squadron disbanded and reformed as IV (Reserve) Squadron at RAF Wittering, taking over from No. 20 (R) Squadron as the Harrier Operational Conversion Unit. As a result of the 2010 Strategic Defence and Security Review, the squadron disbanded in January 2011, only to reform on 24 November 2011, when No. 19 (R) Squadron, operating the BAE Hawk T2 from RAF Valley in the tactical weapons training role, was renumbered.

In March 2020, the squadron was awarded the right to emblazon a battle honour on its squadron standard, recognising its role in Bosnia during 1995.

Aircraft operated
Aircraft operated have included:

 Breguet Type III
 Cody V biplane
 Avro 500
 Farman MF.11
 Voisin III
 Morane-Saulnier H
 Bristol Scout
 Martinsyde S.1
 Caudron G.III
 Royal Aircraft Factory B.E.2
 Royal Aircraft Factory R.E.8
 Bristol F.2 Fighter
 Armstrong Whitworth Atlas
 Hawker Audax
 Hawker Hector
 Westland Lysander
 Curtiss Tomahawk
 North American Mustang
 de Havilland Mosquito
 Supermarine Spitfire
 de Havilland Vampire
 North American Sabre
 Hawker Hunter
 Hawker Siddeley Harrier GR.1 GR.3 T.4
 BAE Harrier II GR5, T12, GR7 GR7A GR9
 BAE Hawk T2

Commanding officers
Commanding officers have included:

See also
List of Royal Air Force aircraft squadrons

References

Citations

Bibliography

 Ashworth, Chris. Encyclopedia of Modern Royal Air Force Squadrons. Wellingborough, UK: Patrick Stevens Limited, 1989. .
 Bruce, J.M. The Aeroplanes of the Royal Flying Corps (Military Wing). London:Putnam, 1982. .
 Halley, James J. The Squadrons of the Royal Air Force. Tonbridge, UK: Air Britain (Historians), 1980. .
 Halley, James J. The Squadrons of the Royal Air Force & Commonwealth, 1918–1988. Tonbridge, Kent, UK: Air-Britain (Historians) Ltd., 1988. .
 Jefford, Wing Commander C.G. RAF Squadrons, a Comprehensive Record of the Movement and Equipment of all RAF Squadrons and their Antecedents since 1912. Shrewsbury: Airlife Publishing, 2001. .
 Lewis, Peter. Squadron Histories: R.F.C, R.N.A.S and R.A.F., 1912–59. London: Putnam, 1959.
 Moyes, Philip J.R. Bomber Squadrons of the RAF and their Aircraft. London: Macdonald and Jane's (Publishers) Ltd., 1964 (new edition 1976). .
 Rawlings, John D.R. Coastal, Support and Special Squadrons of the RAF and their Aircraft. London: Jane's Publishing Company Ltd., 1982. .
 Rawlings, John D.R. Fighter Squadrons of the RAF and their Aircraft. London: Macdonald and Jane's (Publishers) Ltd., 1969 (new edition 1976, reprinted 1978). .
 Yoxall, John. "No. 4 Squadron RAF:The History of One of Our Most Famous Units". Flight, 23 February 1953, pp. 255–262.

External links

 Royal Air Force Museum Laarbruch-Weeze
 IV Sqn Association

Flight training in the United Kingdom
Military units and formations established in 1912
004 Squadron
004 Squadron
1912 establishments in the United Kingdom
Military units and formations disestablished in 2011